The 2008 WNBA season was the 12th season for the San Antonio Silver Stars.

Offseason

Expansion Draft
 Chantelle Anderson was selected in the 2008 Expansion Draft for the Atlanta Dream.

WNBA Draft

Transactions

Trades

Free agents

Regular season
Silver Stars guard Shanna Crossley tore the ACL in her left knee during a preseason game against the Detroit Shock. The news was announced by head coach and general manager Dan Hughes on May 14. Crossley injured her knee during San Antonio’s second offensive possession of the game.

Season standings

Season schedule

WNBA Playoffs

° Played in the Galen Center, Los Angeles, CA 
^ Played in the EMU Convocation Center, Ypsilanti, MI

Player stats

Regular season

San Antonio Silver Stars Regular Season Stats

Postseason

San Antonio Silver Stars Playoff Stats

Roster

Awards and honors
 Sophia Young, WNBA Player of the Week (May 17–25)
 Becky Hammon, WNBA Player of the Week (July 7–13)
 Ann Wauters, WNBA Player of the Week (September 8–14)
 Sophia Young, WNBA All-Defensive First Team
 Vickie Johnson, Kim Perrot Sportsmanship Award
 Sophia Young, All-WNBA First Team
 Becky Hammon, All-WNBA Second Team

References

San Antonio Stars seasons
San Antonio
Western Conference (WNBA) championship seasons